Dagmar Sandvig (8 July 1921 – 1 November 1989) was a Norwegian politician for the Conservative Party.

She served as a deputy representative to the Parliament of Norway from Møre og Romsdal during the terms 1954–1957 and 1969–1973. In total she met during 30 days of parliamentary session.

References

1921 births
1989 deaths
Deputy members of the Storting
Conservative Party (Norway) politicians
Møre og Romsdal politicians
Women members of the Storting
20th-century Norwegian women politicians
20th-century Norwegian politicians